Petrovsk-Zabaykalsky may refer to:
Petrovsk-Zabaykalsky District, a district of Zabaykalsky Krai, Russia
Petrovsk-Zabaykalsky (town), a town in Zabaykalsky Krai, Russia
Petrovsk-Zabaykalsky Urban Okrug, the municipal formation which this town is incorporated as